Lewisville is an unincorporated community in northern Clarke County, Virginia. Lewisville lies on Lewisville Road to the southwest of Franklintown, West Virginia.

Unincorporated communities in Clarke County, Virginia
Unincorporated communities in Virginia